Aneesurrehman is an Indian politician and a member of the 16th Legislative Assembly of Uttar Pradesh of India. He represented the Kanth constituency of Uttar Pradesh and is a member of the Peace Party of India.

Early life and education
Aneesurrehman was born in Kasampur in Moradabad district, Uttar Pradesh. He holds B.Com and LLB degrees from Aligarh Muslim University. Before being elected as MLA, he used to work as an agriculturist.

Political career
Aneesurrehman has been a MLA for one term and represents the Kanth constituency. He is a member of the Peace Party of India political party.

He lost his seat in the 2017 Uttar Pradesh Assembly election to Rajesh Kumar Singh of the Bharatiya Janata Party.

Posts Held

See also
Kanth
Peace Party of India
Politics of India
Sixteenth Legislative Assembly of Uttar Pradesh
Uttar Pradesh Legislative Assembly

References 

Peace Party of India politicians
Uttar Pradesh MLAs 2012–2017
Faculty of Law, Aligarh Muslim University alumni
People from Moradabad district
1963 births
Living people
Samajwadi Party politicians from Uttar Pradesh